was a fashion and music event held on April 19, 2014, at Yoyogi National Gymnasium 1st Gymnasium in Tokyo, Japan. In this event, Dewi Sukarno, known as one of the wives of the first President of Indonesia and Japanese tarento, appeared as a secret guest. Funassyi, the mascot character of Funabashi city and Japanese cartoon character Crayon Shin-chan appeared as a run model. The main MCs are Japanese comedy duo Cocorico and Fuji Television newscaster Mio Matsumura.

Models 
 Kozue Akimoto, Sayaka Akimoto, Keisuke Asano, Saki Asamiya, AMO, Moe Arai, Nozomi Araki, Yuko Araki, Mayuko Arisue, Marie Iitoyo, Nicole Ishida, Haru Izumi, Nina Itō, Hana Imai, IMALU, Mao Ueda, Arisa Urahama, Manami Enosawa, emma, Elli-Rose, Mitsuki Oishi, Aya Ōmasa, Kana Oya, Sayaka Okada, Azusa Okamoto, Nanaka Ozawa(X21), Reina Kagami, Miwako Kakei, Natsuki Katō, Ai Garan, CAROLINA, Mayuko Kawakita, Rei Kikukawa, Reina Kizu, Coco Kinoshita, Koharu Kusumi, Eimi Kuroda, Kelly, Kelly Ann, Azusa Koizumi, Aya Kondō, Chihiro Kondō, Yuri Konno, Kentaro Sakaguchi, Remi Sakamoto, Yui Sakuma, Arisa Sato, Kayo Satoh, Shiori Sato, Satoumi, Miki Satō, Yuki Shikanuma, Serina, Sen, Maryjun Takahashi, Yoshiaki Takahashi, Ai Takahara, Aya Takizawa, Seika Taketomi, Tina Tamashiro, Akemi Darenogare, Megumi Chikuni, Hazuki Tsuchiya, Dawkins Erina, Reina Triendl, An Nakamura, Riisa Naka, Nanao, Ryo Narita, Yuka Nanjō, Nicole, Arisa Nishida, Yayoi Nemoto, Nanami Hashimoto(Nogizaka46), Stephanie Hanon, Haruki, Ikumi Hisamatsu, Lena Fujii, Sachie Futamura, Seika Furuhata, Maggy, Harris Mako, Airi Matsui, Marie, Arie Mizusawa, Yuka Mizuhara, Angelica Michibata, Kaoru Mitsumune, Juliana Minato, Akina Minami, Mai Miyagi, Seira Miyazawa, Satoko Miyata, Yōko Melody, Kōji Moriya, Alissa Yagi, Misako Yasuda, Tomoya Yamaguchi, Hirona Yamazaki, Yamada James Takeshi, Yu Yamada, Mizuki Yamamoto, Yūki Yamamoto, Sayo Yoshida, Natsumi Yoshida, Miyu Yoshimoto(X21), Youn-a, Loveli, Ayano Wakayama(X21)

Artists 
 Kyary Pamyu Pamyu, Ayame Goriki, Silent Siren, The Second from Exile, CTS, Super Junior Donghae & Eunhyuk, Chay, Flower, m-flo(VerbalL&☆Taku)X21, Yu-A, Yume Miru Adolescence

Guests 
 Ai Haruna, Funassyi, Dewi Sukarno, Nozomi Sasaki, Crayon Shin-chan, Masami Nagasawa, Toshihiko Tahara

Brands 
 American eagle Outfitters, Ank Rouge, Azul by moussy, Be Radiance, Bershka, Cecil McBee, Dazzlin, Dickies, Emoda, Evris, Fig & Viper, Forever 21, Galsia Markez, Global Work, Guild Prime, Heather, Loco Boutique, Loveless, Lowry's Farm, Mita, Million Carats, Moussy, Muse Muse, Nomine, Old navy, Rodeo Crowns, Royal Party, Sly, Smaddy, Spinns, Spiralgirl, Stradivarius, Titty&Co., Ungrid, Wego.

References

External links 
 

Fashion events in Japan
Japanese fashion
Japanese subcultures
Events in Tokyo
Annual events in Japan
Semiannual events
2014 in Japan
2014 awards